Mont Tendre is a mountain of the Jura, located between the valley of Joux and the basin of Lake Geneva in the canton of Vaud. With an elevation of 1,679 metres above sea level, it is the highest summit of the Swiss portion of the Jura Mountains and, therefore, the highest summit of Switzerland outside the Alps. It is also the most isolated mountain of the canton. It is found in the community of Montricher.

A paved road from Montricher reaches a height of 1,615 metres, northeast of the summit. A restaurant is located at its end, the Chalet du Mont Tendre.

See also
List of mountains of Vaud
List of mountains of Switzerland
List of most isolated mountains of Switzerland

References

External links

Mont Tendre on Hikr
Chalet du Mont Tendre

Mountains of Switzerland
Mountains of the Jura
Mountains of the canton of Vaud
One-thousanders of Switzerland